Pulsatilla integrifolia is a species of plant in the family Ranunculaceae endemic to Sakhalin.

References

integrifolia